The 2010 Arizona Wildcats football team represented the University of Arizona in the college football season of 2010. The team's head coach was Mike Stoops. The Wildcats played their home games at Arizona Stadium in Tucson, Arizona. They finished with a record of 7–6 (4–5 Pac-10) and a loss to Oklahoma State in the Alamo Bowl.

Schedule

Rankings

Game summaries

Toledo

The Citadel

Iowa

California

Oregon State

Washington State

Washington

Matt Scott, the junior quarterback from Corona, California, led the 15th-ranked Wildcats to an offensive bonanza and 44-14 win over the visiting Washington Huskies at Arizona Stadium. Scott had help, of course. Arizona tailbacks Nicolas Grigsby and Keola Antolin scored two touchdowns apiece in the first three quarters, before a sellout crowd of 56,244 on Arizona's homecoming night.
Scott had no trouble replacing the injured starting quarterback, Nick Foles, and Arizona easily handled up-and-down Washington. Arizona (6-1, 3-1 Pac-10) overcame occasionally poor tackling with a balanced offense and by harassing Jake Locker into an ineffective game. Washington (3-4, 2-2) continued its season-long, win-one, lose-one pattern, following last week's thrilling double-overtime victory over then-No. 24 Oregon State with a defensive clunker. The inexperienced Scott outplayed Locker, widely viewed as one of the top quarterbacks in the country. Washington's senior quarterback completed just 11 of 19 first-half passes for 139 yards and a score. Known for his game-changing speed, Locker was held without a rush in the first half; he lost 24 yards on six carries before being replaced by Keith Price early in the fourth quarter.
 In the AP Top 25 poll released October 24, Arizona retained its No. 15 ranking despite the victory.

UCLA 

Arizona held off UCLA 29-21; the Wildcats rolled up a season-high 583 yards and 32 first downs and held the Bruins to 299 yards and 15 first downs. Matt Scott had another big game in the absence of Nick Foles, completing 24 of 36 passes for a career-high 319 yards with one touchdown and one interception and rushing for another 71 yards on 12 carries. RB Keola Antolin rushed for 111 yards on 23 carries for the Wildcats (7-1, 4-1 Pac-10), off to their best start since winning seven of their first eight games en route to a 12-1 finish in 1998. Coach Mike Stoops shocked the Bruins by calling a fake punt on fourth-and-3 from the Arizona 27 with 6:23 remaining and the Wildcats leading 26-21. Jake Fischer ran for 29 yards to give the Wildcats a big first down. The play enabled the Wildcats to eat up some time before having to punt. The Bruins turned the ball over on downs, putting the Wildcats in position for Alex Zendejas' third field goal of the game, a 30-yarder. UCLA's final chance ended when Brooks Reed sacked UCLA quarterback Richard Brehaut and caused a fumble, which Sione Tuihalamaka recovered with 48 seconds left. Brehaut passed for a career-best 228 yards and two touchdowns for the Bruins (3-5, 1-4), who lost their third straight game but performed much better than in their last two, when they were outscored 95-20 at California and Oregon. But Arizona did enough for its fourth straight road victory dating to last season, keeping them alive for their first-ever berth in the Rose Bowl. With the win, the 'Cats improved to No. 13 in the AP Top 25 poll released October 31.

Stanford

USC

Oregon

Arizona State

Alamo Bowl

References

Arizona
Arizona Wildcats football seasons
Arizona Wildcats football